Zachary is a city in East Baton Rouge Parish, Louisiana, United States. At the 2020 census, Zachary's population increased to 19,316.

History
Much of the land which the city now occupies was part of a  farm owned by Darel Zachary (1827-1907). In the 1880s, Zachary sold his land to the Illinois Central Railroad, who built a track and a depot on it. A village quickly grew up around the depot, which came to be called "Zachary" after the original farmer. Zachary's first post office was opened in 1885, and it was incorporated as a city on August 2, 1889, with Thomas Edward McHugh as its first mayor. A fire devastated the city in 1903, supposedly caused by a greengrocer trying to flame-ripen his bananas. The "historic village" at the center of the city is composed of buildings which either survived the fire, or were built shortly after it, the oldest (excluding the depot) being the 1898 Allison House. The first census was carried out in 1914 and reported just 419 residents. In 1966 Zachary became the first city in Louisiana since the Reconstruction Era to elect a Republican as mayor, Jack Louis Breaux.

Geography
Zachary is located in northern East Baton Rouge Parish. It is bordered to the north by the city of Slaughter, to the east by Central, and to the south by Baker. Louisiana Highway 19 passes through the city, leading north  to the center of Slaughter and south  to U.S. Route 61 in the northern part of Baton Rouge.

Climate

Demographics

As of the 2020 United States census, there were 19,316 people, 5,790 households, and 4,267 families residing in the city. At the 2019 American Community Survey, 17,283 people lived in the city. As of 2019, the racial and ethnic makeup of the city was 49.1% non-Hispanic white, 47.6% Black and African American, 1.2% Asian, 0.3% some other race, and 1.8% two or more races. Hispanics or Latin Americans of any race made up 0.5% of the population.

Of the population in 2019, there was a poverty rate of 7.9% and median household income of $84,795. Males had a median household income of $62,920 versus $49,092 for females. The median age of Zachary was 35.1 at the 2019 American Community Survey, and 69.4% of the population were aged 18 and older. 

At the 2000 United States census, there were 11,275 people, 3,836 households, and 3,064 families residing in the city. The racial makeup of the city was 69.76% White, 28.72% African American, 0.19% Native American, 0.46% Asian, 0.32% from other races, and 0.55% from two or more races. Hispanic or Latino of any race were 0.72% of the population.

There were 3,836 households, out of which 43.4% had children under the age of 18 living with them, 60.2% were married couples living together, 15.6% had a female householder with no husband present, and 20.1% were non-families. 17.5% of all households were made up of individuals, and 7.4% had someone living alone who was 65 years of age or older. The average household size was 2.88 and the average family size was 3.26.

The population was spread out across age groups with 30.0% under 18, 8.8% from 18 to 24, 29.5% from 25 to 44, 20.8% from 45 to 64, and 10.8% who were 65 or older. The median age was 34 years. For every 100 females, there were 90.5 males. For every 100 females age 18 and over, there were 86.7 males in the same age range.

The median income for a household in the city was $49,669, and the median income for a family was $57,389. Males had a median income of $45,092 versus $25,143 for females. The per capita income for the city was $18,554. About 6.9% of families and 9.1% of the population were below the poverty line, including 12.6% of those under age 18 and 7.9% of those age 65 or over.

Education
Zachary residents are served by the Zachary Community School Board.

The Zachary Community School System separated from the East Baton Rouge Parish School System in 2003.

Infrastructure
The United States Postal Service operates the Zachary Post Office.

East Baton Rouge Parish Library operates the Zachary Branch. In 1939 the library initially opened in the former town hall, and it subsequently moved to a former post office; a third building; and in 1966, in a structure attached to the Louisiana National Bank building. The library later began using the meeting room in the bank building. The current library opened on May 4, 2004, in a  structure on land purchased by the EBR library system in 2001. The groundbreaking for that building, designed by Cockfield - Jackson Architects, was held in December 2002.

Notable people 
 Frank Brian (1923–2017), Zachary High School basketball player who played in the first NBA All-Star Game (1950)
 Kedrick Brown (born 1981), Zachary High School basketball player who was the first junior college player to be selected in the NBA draft
 Donna Douglas (1932-2015), actress famous for playing Elly May Clampett on The Beverly Hillbillies situation comedy from 1962 to 1971; born in 1932 in nearby Pride, Louisiana
 Trindon Holliday (born 1986), wide receiver and return specialist for the Tampa Bay Buccaneers
 Johnny Huggins (born 1976), American football player
 Tonya Johnson (born 1969), American volleyball coach
 John Kennedy (born 1951), United States Senator and former Louisiana state treasurer
 Roderick Mullen (born 1972), NFL cornerback
 Bob Odom (1935-2014), former Louisiana agriculture commissioner
 Boston Scott (born 1995), running back and kick returner for the Philadelphia Eagles
 Leonard Scott (born 1980), former world champion sprinter and NFL player
 Richard Stalder (born 1951), former secretary of the Louisiana Department of Public Safety and Corrections
 Doug Williams (born 1955), former NFL quarterback for the Washington Redskins and MVP of Super Bowl XXII
 Robert Pete Williams (1914–1980), blues musician
 Gus Young (1909–1969), civil rights leader who co-led the first voters registration drive (1938)
 Shalanda Young, director of the Office of Management and Budget

References

External links

 Zachary Chamber of Commerce

Cities in Louisiana
Cities in East Baton Rouge Parish, Louisiana
Cities in the Baton Rouge metropolitan area